Thelymitra lucida, commonly called the glistening sun orchid, is a species of orchid that is endemic to south eastern Australia. It has a single erect, fleshy leaf and up to seven dark blue flowers with the sepals a lighter blue than the petals.

Description
The lobe on the top of the anther is dark purplish black with a yellow tip and covered with a glistening secretion. It is also inflated, gently curved and deeply notched. The side lobes have toothbrush-like tufts of white, cream or yellow hairs. Flowering occurs in November and December but the flowers are self-pollinated and only open on hot days.

Taxonomy and naming
Thelymitra lucida was first formally described in 2004 by Jeff Jeanes. The description was published in Muelleria from a specimen collected near Durdidwarrah. The specific epithet (lucida) is a Latin word meaning "full of light", "clear" or "bright", referring to the glistening lobe on top of the column.

Distribution and habitat
The glistening sun orchid usually grows in or near swamps in the Grampians and Brisbane Ranges National Park of Victoria and south of Hobart in Tasmania.

References

External links
 

lucida
Endemic orchids of Australia
Orchids of Victoria (Australia)
Orchids of Tasmania
Plants described in 2004